Psi Upsilon, commonly known as Psi U, is a North American fraternity, founded at Union College on November 24, 1833. The fraternity reports 50 chapters at colleges and universities throughout North America, some of which are inactive.

Psi Upsilon's foundation provides scholarships and other financial guidance to students throughout the United States and Canada, giving preference to its own members, as well as mentoring and other support services.

History

In 1833, five sophomore and two freshman members of the Delphian Society, a local literary group, had become friends and began to meet regularly to exchange essays and engage in literary debate. The seven men thus founded Psi Upsilon on the evening of November 24, 1833. The first constitution was adopted on January 10, 1834.

The first expansion chapter was started in 1837, when a member of Psi Upsilon at Union transferred to New York University.  Ten chapters were founded in the first ten years, and eight more chapters were founded in the twenty years after that. By 1904, when the last founding father, Edward Martindale, died, there were 23 chapters and more than 11,000 members.

During World War II, a few chapters, such as the Omicron, rented their houses to the Army as barracks and offices.  One chapter, the Epsilon Nu, rented its house to a sorority (Gamma Phi Beta). The rental income these chapters received allowed them to survive. Other chapters, such as the Lambda and Eta, could not afford the taxes and upkeep on an empty house and had to sell.

After the war, the executive council hired professional staff and established a central office to assist chapters. At first the office consolidated initiation records and address lists, published a newsletter, and secured the fraternity's historical artifacts. Over time, the staff's size and function grew. Young alumni were hired to visit chapters as educational and leadership consultants, reviewing chapter operations and suggesting ways to improve. Leadership training was developed and expanded, and regular conclaves began to be held to train officers and alumni. Handbooks were published for each officer position and for general programs. Alumni associations were given professional advice on fundraising and house renovations. Within twelve years of the end of the war, five chapters were reactivated and four new chapters were chartered.

Fraternity firsts
Psi Upsilon was the first fraternity to
 Hold a fraternity convention (1841) 
 Print a membership catalogue (1842)
 Print the fraternity history (1843)
 Print a fraternity songbook (1849)
 Issue a fraternity magazine (1850)

Notable alumni

Chapters

Most chapters of Psi Upsilon retain the same type of governance: a president, two vice-presidents, a recording secretary, and a treasurer. The President presides over all meetings and enforces obedience to the Constitution and to the chapter bylaws. The First Vice President is the internal vice president and helps maintain an efficient system of communication among the brothers. The Second Vice President is the external vice president and serves as coordinator for public relations. Chapter may also have other leadership positions.

Notable controversies
In 1971, Bowdoin College, formerly all male, decided to admit women to the college. The members of Kappa chapter of Psi Upsilon also voted to accept women that year becoming the first co-ed fraternity on Bowdoin's campus and in Psi Upsilon.  In 1976, Patricia “Barney” Geller attended the national meeting as Kappa's president. And Psi U distinguished itself by not revoking Kappa's charter status.  Instead the Kappa chapter admitted members of both sexes for as long as it existed and was only the first in Psi U to do so.

On the night of Saturday, January 20, 1990, the brothers of Psi Upsilon kidnapped a rival fraternity member, subjecting him to various forms of physical and mental abuse. Penn kicked Psi U off campus less than five months later.

In July 2016, the president of Psi Upsilon's Chi chapter at Cornell University was indicted by a grand jury for sexual abuse of a female Cornell student in the fraternity house. The crime allegedly took place in late January of that year, with initial charges brought in early February. In May the accused student sued Cornell University, saying that their investigation process was flawed and non-compliant with recent changes in State law. The chapter has been suspended by both the national leadership of the fraternity, and Cornell University, although the university cited other violations. Following a racially charged assault on a black student by white members of the house in September 2017, the chapter's alumni board voted to close the chapter indefinitely.

In 2014, Wesleyan University required all male-only fraternities to become coeducational, partly in response to issues with sexual assault and harassment. At the time, Psi Upsilon and Delta Kappa Epsilon were the only recognized fraternities at the school. After Delta Kappa Epsilon's housing was closed for failing to comply with the changes, Psi Upsilon was the remaining fraternity at the school. The fraternity agreed to become coeducational, but the chapter's housing was temporarily suspended by the school before any female students could join. The closure was pending a drug investigation and past claims of sexual assault . As of September 2016, the chapter's house was expected to reopen with both male and female members.

See also

 Pi Chapter House of Psi Upsilon Fraternity
 Xi Chapter, Psi Upsilon Fraternity

Notes

External links

Psi Upsilon
Student organizations established in 1833
International student societies
North American Interfraternity Conference
1833 establishments in New York (state)
Fraternities and sororities based in Indianapolis